José Augusto Cestari Ramos, known as Augusto (Campinas, February 3, 1985), is a Brazilian footballer who currently plays for Agremiação Sportiva Arapiraquense.

References

1985 births
Living people
Brazilian footballers
Fluminense FC players
Ceará Sporting Club players
Tupi Football Club players
Agremiação Sportiva Arapiraquense players
Association football defenders
Sportspeople from Campinas